Fulco I d’Este (c. 1070 – 15 December 1128) was the ancestor of the Italian line of the House of Este.

Life 
Fulco was a son of Albert Azzo II, Margrave of Milan and Garsende of Maine, the daughter of Herbert I, Count of Maine. After his father's death in 1097, Fulco inherited the family's Italian possessions, which lay mainly in Veneto, around Mantua, Padua, Treviso and Verona, while his older half brother Welf inherited the lands north of the Alps. However, Welf did not accept this division, and unsuccessfully attempted to take these lands from Fulco after their father's death in 1097. The powerful Bavarian line of the family, the Guelphs, did not renounce these lands until the time of Henry the Lion in 1154. In 1070 Fulco's brother Hugh was invited to become Count of Maine, taking over the lands of their maternal grandfather, which had been under Norman or Angevin control since 1051, but had broken free.

Fulco's family took their name from the town of Este in Veneto. Fulco made the family's first connections to the nobility of Ferrara, which the Este came to rule a century later.

Family 
Fulco had six children:
 Azzo IV d'Este (died before 1145)
 Bonifacio I d’Este (died 1163)
 Fulco II d'Este (died before 1172)
 Alberto (died after 1184)
 Obizzo I d’Este (died December 25, 1193), grandfather of Azzo VI of Este
 Beatrice (1075-1110) (possibly married in 1108 Alfonso VI of León and Castile).

References

External links 
 Foundations for Medieval Genealogy: Modena, Ferrara. Ch. 1: Marchesi d'Este

1128 deaths
Fulco 1
11th-century Italian nobility
12th-century Italian nobility
Year of birth unknown